The Alabama and Mississippi Rivers Rail Road Company was incorporated under special act of Alabama on February 7, 1850. 

The Alabama and Mississippi Rivers Rail Road Company constructed   of railroad line between Selma, Alabama and York, Alabama during the years 1852 through 1864.

On November 29, 1864, the name of the company was changed to The Selma and Meridian Rail Road Company.

The property eventually became part of Southern Railway Company on July 7, 1894, through Southern's acquisition of a successor company, the East Tennessee, Virginia and Georgia Railway Company.

See also 

 Confederate railroads in the American Civil War
 Selma and Meridian Railroad

Notes

References 
 Interstate Commerce Commission. Southern Ry. Co., Volume 37, Interstate Commerce Commission Valuation Reports, November 6, 1931. Washington: United States Government Printing Office, 1932. .

Defunct Alabama railroads
Predecessors of the Southern Railway (U.S.)
Railway companies established in 1850
Railway companies disestablished in 1871
5 ft gauge railways in the United States
American companies established in 1850